Mark C. "Chris" Nowland (born February 6, 1958) is a retired United States Air Force lieutenant general.

He last served as the Deputy Chief of Staff for Operations, Plans and Requirements, Headquarters, United States Air Force from October 2016 to October 2018. In that role, he was responsible to the Secretary of the Air Force and the Chief of Staff for formulating policy supporting air, space, cyber, and irregular warfare, counter proliferation, homeland security and weather operations. As the Air Force operations deputy to the Joint Chief of Staff, the general determined operational requirements, capabilities and training necessary to support national security objectives and military strategy.

General Nowland is the son of Col. Benoni “Ben” Nowland IV who earned several medals in Vietnam including a Distinguished Flying Cross. General Nowland followed in his father's career as a 1985 graduate from the U.S. Air Force Academy. He has commanded at the squadron, wing and numbered Air Force levels. He also served on the Joint Staff, U.S. Southern Command and two Air Force major command staffs. The general has flown combat operations in support of operations Southern Watch and Iraqi Freedom. He is also a graduate of the School of Advanced Air and Space Studies and was a National Security Fellow at the Olin Institute at Harvard University. Prior to his final assignment as Deputy Chief of Staff for Operations, Plans and Requirements, General Nowland was the Commander, 12th Air Force, Air Combat Command and Commander, Air Forces Southern, U.S. Southern Command, Davis-Monthan Air Force Base, Arizona.

General Nowland is a command pilot with more than 3,600 flying hours, primarily in the A-10, F-15A/C/D, T-37B, T-38A/C, A/T-38B and T-6.

Awards and decorations

References

External links

1958 births
Living people
United States Air Force Academy alumni
Embry–Riddle Aeronautical University alumni
United States Air Force generals
Recipients of the Air Force Distinguished Service Medal
Recipients of the Defense Superior Service Medal
Recipients of the Legion of Merit